George Whale (25 November 1849 – 4 May 1925) was a former English solicitor and freethinker.

Biography

Whale worked as a solicitor in Huntingdon and Woolwich. He was the Mayor of Woolwich (1908–1909) and was a Liberal parliamentary candidate for Marylebone. He was a fellow of the Royal Historical Society and member of the Folklore Society, Johnson Club, Omar Khayyam Club, National Liberal Club and Samuel Pepys Club. He lived at York Terrace and had a library of 60,000 books.

Whale was Chairman of the Rationalist Press Association, 1922–1925.

Whale was a friend of H. G. Wells. He was married to author Winifred Stephens.

Whale collapsed and died after giving a speech at the Annual Dinner of the Rationalist Press Association in 1925.

Publications
Greater London and Its Government: A Manual and Yearbook (1888)
Johnson Club Papers by Various Hands (1899)

References

Further reading

Edward Clodd, Clement Shorter and Winifred Stephens Whale. (1926). George Whale 1849–1925. London: Jonathan Cape.

1849 births
1925 deaths
19th-century English male writers
19th-century English non-fiction writers
20th-century English male writers
20th-century English non-fiction writers
English bibliophiles
English male non-fiction writers
English sceptics
English solicitors
Freethought writers
Mayors of places in Greater London
Members of Woolwich Metropolitan Borough Council
Rationalists